Hyperolius soror is a species of frog in the family Hyperoliidae. It is endemic to Guinea as it is known with certainty only from Nzérékoré in the southern part of the country, although it is likely that it occurs in adjacent Liberia and western Ivory Coast. Common name soror reed frog has been coined for this species.

Taxonomy
Taxonomic status of this species described by French herpetologist Paul Chabanaud in 1921 is unsettled. The Amphibian Species of the World treats Hyperolius soror as a valid species but notes that Hyperolius wermuthi might be its synonym. The AmphibiaWeb, however, considers it a nomen dubium, but acknowledges that it might be the correct name for Hyperolius wermuthi.

Habitat
Ecology of this species is unknown as researchers after Chabanaud have used the name Hyperolius wermuthi for what likely is this species. It is presumably an inhabitant of primary forest.

References

soror
Frogs of Africa
Amphibians of West Africa
Endemic fauna of Guinea
Taxa named by Paul Chabanaud
Amphibians described in 1921
Taxonomy articles created by Polbot